Carlo Tresoldi (born 6 October 1952 in Boltiere; died 13 July 1995 in Milan of cancer) was an Italian professional footballer who played as a forward.

He played 3 seasons (31 games, 4 goals) in the Serie A for A.C. Milan and Varese F.C.

Honours
Milan
 Coppa Italia winner: 1971–72, 1972–73.
 UEFA Cup Winners' Cup winner: 1972–73.

External links
 Profile at magliarossonera.it 

1952 births
1995 deaths
Deaths from cancer in Lombardy
Italian footballers
Serie A players
Serie B players
A.C. Milan players
S.S.D. Varese Calcio players
F.C. Grosseto S.S.D. players
U.S. 1913 Seregno Calcio players
Association football forwards